Keyvan Andres Soori (born 8 March 2000, in Cologne, Germany) is a German-Iranian racing driver.

Career

Karting
Keyvan Andres Soori started his racing career in karting in 2011. He competed in the Minimes class of the regional Provence-Alpes-Côte d'Azur championship. The eleven-year-old also competed in the French Bridgestone Cup. The following year the young German driver joined the Kerpener Kart Challenge in the KF3 class placing fifth in the championship. Andres was entered by Lotus Racing Karts, a subsidiary of Group Lotus. Keyvan also entered the ADAC Kart Masters event at Kerpen racing other future stars like Mick Schumacher. The year 2013 was the final year in karts for the German driver. Andres scored five points in the  WSK Super Master Series KFJ class.

Open Wheel
United States
In 2013 Keyvan Andres made his debut in formula racing. At Virginia International Raceway Keyvan Andres, racing under the name Keyvan Soori, came in fourth in his first Skip Barber Formula 2000 race. Drivers like Colton Herta, Garth Rickards and Nikita Lastochkin also competed in the race. Andres was eventually placed eleventh in the championship winning one race, at Road Atlanta. In the winter of 2013–14 Soori won the Skip Barber Winter Series, winning seven out of fourteen races to take the title. Due to his success Andres graduated into the Mazda Road to Indy program. In 2014 he raced for Cape Motorsports-Wayne Taylor Racing in the USF2000 championship supporting the IndyCar Series. At Indianapolis Soori scored his best result finishing in sixth place. For 2015 Andres switched teams joining ArmsUp Motorsports for their USF2000 campaign. Soori was the first German-registered driver since 2006 (Andreas Wirth) to win an Atlantic Championship race. The fifteen-year-old won his debut race in the series at Watkins Glen International.

New Zealand
In December 2016, Andres Soori was named as part of the Giles Motorsport line-up for the Toyota Racing Series. He finished 11th in the standings with a best result of 8th twice.

Europe
In 2017, he was signed to Motopark for the 2017 European Formula 3 Championship, where he switched to competing under an Iranian license.

Personal life
Keyvan was born in Cologne, Germany on 3 March 2000 to parents with Persian roots. When Keyvan was two years old the family moved to France. In 2013 Keyvan moved to Naples, Florida. The young German attended the Community School of Naples. Keyvan graduated from the Community School of Naples in 2017.

Racing record

Career summary

American Open-Wheel racing results
(key) (Races in bold indicate pole position, races in italics indicate fastest race lap)

U.S. F2000 National Championship

Atlantic Championship

Complete Euroformula Open Championship results 
(key) (Races in bold indicate pole position; races in italics indicate points for the fastest lap of top ten finishers)

Complete Toyota Racing Series results 
(key) (Races in bold indicate pole position) (Races in italics indicate fastest lap)

Complete FIA Formula 3 European Championship results
(key) (Races in bold indicate pole position) (Races in italics indicate fastest lap)

Complete Macau Grand Prix results

Complete FIA Formula 3 Championship results
(key) (Races in bold indicate pole position; races in italics indicate points for the fastest lap of top ten finishers)

References

External links
Keyvan Andres Soori on DriverDB.com

2000 births
Living people
Sportspeople from Cologne
German people of Iranian descent
Racing drivers from North Rhine-Westphalia
Atlantic Championship drivers
U.S. F2000 National Championship drivers
Euroformula Open Championship drivers
Toyota Racing Series drivers
FIA Formula 3 European Championship drivers
FIA Formula 3 Championship drivers
Carlin racing drivers
Iranian racing drivers
Wayne Taylor Racing drivers
Motopark Academy drivers
Van Amersfoort Racing drivers
HWA Team drivers
German expatriate sportspeople in the United States
Mücke Motorsport drivers